John Blair (born 17 March 1955) is a former Australian rules footballer who played with the South Melbourne Football Club, Fitzroy Football Club and St Kilda Football Club in the Victorian Football League (VFL). He has since become a successful coach in Queensland and is currently senior coach of the Aspley Football Club.

A utility, Blair spent a lot of his career as a centre-half back but was also used up forward. He had begun his career at Noble Park Football Club and it was from there was he was recruited to South Melbourne. He made his VFL debut in 1975, against Footscray at Waverley Park, but it was the only game he played that season. Over the next two years he put together 23 senior appearances, only to be traded to Fitzroy during the 1978 season. He didn't play a VFL match in 1979 and in 1980 was playing for his third club, St Kilda. He appeared just twice for St Kilda and left at the end of the year, to captain-coach Queensland club Morningside.

Blair, who won the Grogan Medal in 1982, steered Morningside to the QAFL grand final ever year from 1982 to 1984. Each time they lost, but Blair would later play in a premiership with Windsor-Zillmere in 1988, before retiring. He had been their best forward that season, with 96 goals. It was the second time he had been the league's leading goal-kicker, having kicked 86 goals with Morningside in 1985. Before coming to Windsor-Zillmere, he had a brief stint with Sandgate. During the 1980s he had been a regular interstate football representative, playing for Queensland 19 times.

In the early 1990s, Blair was involved in coaching with the Brisbane Bears and after some time away returned to the QAFL in 2002 to again coach Morningside. He twice coached them to back to back premierships, first in 2003 and 2004, then again in 2009 and 2010. In total he has coached 11 QAFL grand finals, for a return of five premierships.

He is the father of television actress, Natalie Blair, and the uncle of Collingwood premiership player Jarryd Blair.

References

1955 births
Sydney Swans players
Fitzroy Football Club players
St Kilda Football Club players
Casey Demons players
Morningside Australian Football Club players
Zillmere Eagles Australian Football Club players
Sandgate Football Club players
Australian rules footballers from Victoria (Australia)
Living people